Thomas Weston "Bucko" Trainor (September 11, 1922 – November 21, 1991) was a professional ice hockey player who played 17 games in the National Hockey League.  He played with the New York Rangers.

After playing with the Canadian Army in the UK during the war years, Wes "Bucko" Trainor was a hockey star in the Maritimes and Newfoundland through the late 1940s and 1950s. He also coached senior and minor hockey in Grand Falls and Gander NL. He has been enshrined in the PEI Sports Hall of Fame as an Athlete, and in the Sport Newfoundland and Labrador Hall of Fame as an Athlete-Builder.

External links

1922 births
1991 deaths
Canadian ice hockey left wingers
Ice hockey people from Prince Edward Island
New York Rangers players
Sportspeople from Charlottetown
Canadian expatriates in the United States